Storhøe (or its alternate spellings Storhø, Storhøi or Storhøa) may refer to:

People
Dennis Storhøi (born 1960), a Norwegian actor

Places
Storhøa (Rauma), a mountain in Rauma municipality in Møre og Romsdal county, Norway
Storhøe (Fokstugu, Dovre), a mountain in Dovre municipality in Innlandet county, Norway
Storhøi (Lom), a mountain in Lom municipality in Innlandet county, Norway
Storhøi (Lesja), a mountain in Lesja municipality in Innlandet county, Norway